Holiday Strings is a cover album by American shred guitarist Michael Angelo Batio. The album features classical Christmas songs on acoustic guitar, and for every copy sold, $1.00 was donated to the "Joey's Angels" Children's Leukemia Foundation.

Track listing
All songs are traditional, except where noted.

"Deck the Halls" – 2:29
"God Rest Ye Merry, Gentlemen" – 2:47
"Joy to the World" (George Frideric Handel) – 2:10
"The First Noel" – 2:47
"Shalom Chaverim" – 3:15
"O Holy Night" (Adolphe Adam) – 4:29
"What Child is This?/We Three Kings of Orient Are" (Trad., John H. Hopkins) – 3:27
"Away in a Manger" – 2:28
"Do You Hear What I Hear?" – 3:07
"Silent Night" (Franz Gruber) – 3:04
"We Wish You a Merry Christmas" – 3:03

References

External links
Michael Angelo Batio official website

Michael Angelo Batio albums
1996 Christmas albums
Christmas albums by American artists
Rock Christmas albums